This article lists the squads for the 2012 FIFA U-20 Women's World Cup, held in Japan. Each competing federation was allowed a 21-player squad, which had to be submitted to FIFA.

Group A

Japan
Coach: Hiroshi Yoshida

Mexico
Coach: Leonardo Cuéllar

New Zealand
Coach: Aaron McFarland

Switzerland
Coach: Yannick Schwery

Group B

Brazil
Coach: Caio Couto

Italy
Coach: Corrado Corradini

Nigeria
Coach: Okon Edwin

South Korea
Coach: Jong Song-chon

Group C

Argentina
Coach: Carlos Borrello

Canada
Coach: Andrew Olivieri

North Korea
Coach: Sin Ui-gun

Norway
Coach: Jarl Torske

Group D

China PR
Coach: Yin Tiesheng

Germany
Coach: Maren Meinert

Ghana
Coach: Robert Sackey

United States
Coach: Steve Swanson

External links

FIFA U-20 Women's World Cup squads
2012 in youth sport